Zeinebou Mint Taleb Moussa is a women's rights activist in Mauritania, focused on combating sexual violence through her work as founder of El Wafa, a survivors' center, and as president of the non-governmental organization the Mauritanian Association for Maternal and Child Health (AMSME).

Career 

Mint Taleb Moussa was trained as a midwife, and worked in the Mauritanian Ministry of Health. In 2000, together with other midwives, she established the AMSME, to educate women about reproductive health and rights. In beginning their work, however, they realized that another issue, sexual violence, needed addressing. So in 2001, she founded the El Wafa center in Nouakchott to help victims of rape and sexual assault.

In 2016 she was named by the president of Mauritania, a member of the National Process for the Prevention of Torture. She has also served as an advisor for the Global Fund for Women.

Mint Taleb Moussa is working with other leaders in Mauritania to draft new laws concerning rape, which is not specifically recognized in the legal code.

Awards and honors 
 OkayAfrica 100 Women, 2017.
 Femme de Courage en Mauritanie pour l’année 2017, presented by United States Ambassador to Mauritania, 2017.

References

Further reading 
 UNFPA, Programming to Address Violence Against Women: 10 case studies, 2006. Chapter 1, "Mauritania: Midwives Call Attention to the Problem of Rape, and Imams Encourage Justice for Its Victims."

Mauritanian women's rights activists
Women nonprofit executives
Chairpersons of non-governmental organizations
Living people
Year of birth missing (living people)
Midwives